Saul Welger (18 April 1931 – 10 October 2002) from Brooklyn, New York, was a United States Paralympic athlete. In the 1960 Summer Paralympics and 1964 Summer Paralympics he competed in multiple sports, including wheelchair basketball.

Welger competed at the 1958 and 1959 Stoke Mandeville Games. In the 1960 and 1964 Paralympics he was a member of the winning United States wheelchair basketball team. In 1976, Welger was inducted into the NWBA Hall of Fame. He hired Junius Kellogg as the first Black coach in wheelchair basketball.

Welger married West German wheelchair athlete Christa E. Zander in 1963; they had two children, born in 1966 and 1970. Saul Welger died in 2002. After Christa Welger's death in 2019, the Christa & Saul Welger Foundation was established, to continue their work in supporting accessible sports opportunities for physically disabled youth.

References

Athletes (track and field) at the 1960 Summer Paralympics
Wheelchair basketball players at the 1960 Summer Paralympics
Wheelchair basketball players at the 1964 Summer Paralympics
Paralympic gold medalists for the United States
Paralympic bronze medalists for the United States
1931 births
2002 deaths
Medalists at the 1960 Summer Paralympics
Medalists at the 1964 Summer Paralympics
Paralympic medalists in athletics (track and field)
Paralympic track and field athletes of the United States
Paralympic medalists in wheelchair basketball
Wheelchair shot putters
Paralympic shot putters